Khanapara is a locality in Guwahati, Assam, India. Located in extreme south of Guwahati, it is hub for regional transportation. The Assam Public Service Commission,  Assam Administrative Staff College , The  College of Veterinary Science is located here with other offices of Veterinary department of Assam. Ganesh Mandir Indoor Stadium and Regional Science Centre are located here. This locality is also famous for its Teer Game which is played by people all over the Assam and Meghalaya. The old name of Khanapara was Kainapara. Kaina is a Khasi word, which means elephant, while Para in Khasi language means human settlements or colony.

See also
 Bhetapara
 Beltola 
 Chandmari
 Ganeshguri
 Lokhra

References

Neighbourhoods in Guwahati